Robin Owen Jones (born 4 October 1973) is a former English cricketer. Jones was a right-handed batsman who bowled right-arm off break. He was born at Crewe, Cheshire.

Personal
Jones attended Millfield School. He studied at Durham University before moving on to Cambridge.

Career
Jones made his first-class debut for Cambridge University against Glamorgan in 1996. From 1996 to 1997, he represented the University in 16 first-class matches, the last of which came against Oxford University. In his 16 first-class matches for the University, he scored 530 runs at a batting average of 25.23, with 4 half centuries and a high score of 61. In the field he took 8 catches. With the ball he took 18 wickets at an expensive bowling average of 68.88, with best figures of 3/116.

In 1999, he made his List A debut for the Middlesex Cricket Board against Cumberland in the 1999 NatWest Trophy. He played 2 further List A matches for the Board in the 2000 NatWest Trophy against Wiltshire and Sussex. In his 2 List A matches, he scored 10 runs at an average of 3.33, with a high score of 5. With the ball he took 4 wickets at an average of 9.50, with best figures of 3/54.

Family
His brother, Garri, also played first-class cricket for Cambridge University.

References

External links
Robin Jones at Cricinfo
Robin Jones at CricketArchive

1973 births
Living people
Sportspeople from Crewe
Cricketers from Cheshire
English cricketers
Cambridge University cricketers
Middlesex Cricket Board cricketers
People educated at Millfield
Alumni of Durham University
Alumni of Homerton College, Cambridge